The 5"/25 caliber gun (spoken "five-inch-twenty-five-caliber") entered service as the standard heavy anti-aircraft (AA) gun for United States Washington Naval Treaty cruisers commissioned in the 1920s and 1930s. The goal of the 5"/25 design was to produce a heavy AA gun that was light enough to be rapidly trained manually. The gun was also mounted on pre-World War II battleships and aircraft carriers until replaced by the standard widespread dual-purpose 5"/38 caliber gun, which was derived from the 5"/25. Guns removed from battleships were probably converted for submarine use by late 1943, while a purpose-built variant for submarines was available in mid-1944, and was widely used by them. United States naval gun terminology indicates the gun fired a projectile 5 inches (127 mm) in diameter, and the barrel was 25 calibers long (that is, for a 5" bore and a barrel length of 25 calibers, 5" x 25 = 125", or about 3.2 meters). It is referred to sometimes as a dual purpose gun and sometimes as an anti-aircraft gun, because of its comparative weakness against surface targets.

History

The gun weighed about 2 metric tons and used fixed ammunition (case and projectile handled as a single assembled unit) with a 9.6-pound (4.4 kg) charge of smokeless powder to give a 54-pound (24 kg) projectile a velocity of 2100 feet per second (640 m/s). Useful life expectancy was 4260 effective full charges (EFC) per barrel. The short barrel of the 5"/25 made it much easier to train manually against fast-moving targets. These guns were manually controlled so the short barrel and light weight made it an early favorite as an anti-aircraft gun. Another key feature was power loading, allowing rapid fire at high elevation angles. The 5"/38 caliber gun replaced the 5"/25 as the anti-aircraft weapon of choice on new construction by the mid-1930s due to its better range, velocity against surface targets, and higher vertical ceiling.

5"/25 guns removed from pre-war battleships (especially those rebuilt after Pearl Harbor) had their barrel linings chromed. These guns were remounted for submarine use beginning in late 1943 for extra firepower against small boats and sampans often encountered off the coast of Japan and elsewhere in the Pacific Theater, replacing the earlier 3-inch and 4-inch guns. New production Mark 17 5"/25 guns on the Mark 40 mount designed for submarines became available in mid-1944;  was the first submarine built with this gun. Some submarines had two of these weapons. The Mark 17 gun in the Mark 40 submarine gun mount may have used semi-fixed ammunition (case and projectile handled separately), but existing WW II photographs, drawings of ammunition storage, and museum ships all show fixed ammunition (one piece service round.) The submarine mounting had manual elevation, train, and loading with no power assist.

From late 1944 some submarines were built or refitted with two of these weapons. To further improve the effectiveness of the two-gun configuration, seven submarines were fitted with a Mark 6 "Baby Ford" fire control computer with a Mark 6 stable element to correct for pitch and roll. However, some of these refits were completed in September 1945, too late to see action.

Ships mounting 5"/25 caliber guns

(all heavy and light cruisers in the list are "treaty cruisers")

(none of the heavy cruisers appear to ever have had their secondary battery upgraded, despite quite a few having been heavily damaged and extensively repaired).

 2 (ca. 1927) heavy cruisers:
 , 
 two each port and starboard of the forward superstructure
 two each port and starboard of the aft superstructure
 6 (ca. 1928) heavy cruisers:
 four each port and starboard of the aft superstructure
 originally built with 4 guns and later upgraded

 2 (ca. 1930) heavy cruisers:
 , 
 same layout as Northampton
 7 (ca. 1931) heavy cruisers:
 four each port and starboard of the forward superstructure extending past the stacks

 7 of 9 (ca. 1935) light cruisers:
 four each side adjacent to the forward superstructure extending past the stacks
 Savannah and Honolulu secondary battery was later upgraded
 2 of 9, St. Louis and Helena (ca. 1937), originally built with 5-inch/38 gun mounts.

 2 (ca. 1921 - 1925) aircraft carriers:
 , 
 6 per side
 replaced with 5-inch/38 guns by May 1942 on Saratoga during a surprise visit to the drydock
 still on Lexington when sunk in May 1942

 (ca. 1931)
 originally built with 8 guns

 2  battleships:
 , 
 8 installed in 1927-1930 refits
 replaced with 5-inch/38 guns on Nevada in 1942

 2  battleships:
 , 
 8 installed in 1929 refit
 replaced with 5-inch/38 guns on Pennsylvania in 1942

 3  battleships:
 8 installed in early 1930 modernization
 replaced with 5-inch/38 guns on Idaho in 1942
 still on New Mexico and Mississippi at the end of the war

 2  battleships:
 , 
 8 installed in 1928-1930 refits
 replaced with 5-inch/38 guns in 1942

 3  battleships:
 8 installed in 1928-1930 modernization
 replaced with 5-inch/38 guns in 1942 on Maryland and West Virginia
 still on Colorado at the end of the war

s (as a typical upgrade)
s (standard)
s (standard)

See also
 Deck gun

Notes

References

External links

 5-INCH GUN MOUNT MARK 40, OP 1029, 1944. Manual for submarine gun & mounting Made available online by maritime.org

World War II naval weapons
Naval guns of the United States
127 mm artillery
Naval anti-aircraft guns
Military equipment introduced in the 1920s